The Young Wolves (French: Les jeunes loups) is a 1968 French-Italian drama film directed by Marcel Carné and starring Christian Hay, Haydée Politoff and Yves Beneyton.

The film's sets were designed by the art director Rino Mondellini.

Cast
 Christian Hay as Alain Langlois 
 Haydée Politoff as Sylvie 
 Yves Beneyton as Jean-Emmanuel de Saint-Sever, dit Chris 
 Maurice Garrel as Ugo Castellini 
 Gamil Ratib as Prince Linzani 
 Stéphane Bouy as Riccione, le photographe 
 Rolande Kalis as Evelyne 
 Bernard Dhéran as Jean-Noël 
 Elizabeth Teissier as Princesse Linzani 
 Serge Leeman as Jojo 
 René Lefevre-Bel as Gaston, le majordome 
 Luc Bongrand as Eddie 
 Elina Labourdette as Madame Sinclair 
 Roland Lesaffre as Albert
 Robert De Niro as Un hippie chez Popov
 Jean Panisse as Le garagiste
 Marguerite Muni as Irma, la femme de chambre
  Anny Nelsen as Kim, le modèle
 Gilbert Servien as Inspecteur commissariat

References

Bibliography 
 Edward Baron Turk. Child of Paradise: Marcel Carné and the Golden Age of French Cinema. Harvard University Press, 1989.

External links 
 

1968 films
French drama films
Italian drama films
1968 drama films
1960s French-language films
Films directed by Marcel Carné
Films set in Paris
1960s French films
1960s Italian films